Don't Be Fake is the debut solo album by Russian pop star Sergey Lazarev.

Formerly in boyband duo Smash!!, Sergey and Vlad Topalov dominated Eastern Europe with their albums which reached platinum success.

Although the album has only been released in Eastern Europe it is primarily English songs with an "East meets West"-style ballads and pop songs. The album was recorded in London, England in 2005, but there are currently no plans to release it in the West.

Singles 
 Eye Of The Storm [With a music video shot in South Africa]
 Lost Without Your Love Music video shot in Miami, Florida, USA]
 Just Because You Walk Away
 Fake Music video shot in London, UK]

Track listing

References 

Сергей Лазарев – Don't Be Fake

External links
 Official site (in Russian & English)
 UK Official Site (in English)
 Unofficial site (in Russian)
 Fan-chat

2005 debut albums
Sergey Lazarev albums
Albums produced by Brian Rawling